The American Steamer was an American steam car manufactured by the American Steam Truck Co. of Elgin, Illinois, from 1922 to 1924.

The American Steamer was typical of the steam cars which flooded the market in the early 1920s. It featured a twin-cylinder compound double-acting motor deemed capable of at least . The company offered a touring car, a roadster, a coupe, and a sedan. Between 16 and 20 were built. The prototype was tested as early as 1918, but the company went bankrupt shortly thereafter.

See also 
 American Steam Car
 AMC (automobile)
 Coats Steam Car

References

Vintage vehicles
Defunct motor vehicle manufacturers of the United States
Steam cars
Vehicle manufacturing companies established in 1922
1922 establishments in Illinois
Vehicle manufacturing companies disestablished in 1924
1924 disestablishments in Illinois
Motor vehicle manufacturers based in Illinois